Brian Keith Foster (born June 29, 1972) is an American professional Bicycle Motocross (BMX) rider whose prime competitive years were from 1992–2000. Had the nicknames "Blue Falcon", BF" and "Dirt" Brian Foster is one half of one of those sibling combinations that every so often that appear in BMX, usually brothers and along with his brother Alan they were the Mid School era's answer to Old School's *Brent & Brian Patterson and Eddy & Mike King. While neither gained as many titles in racing either collectively or individually as the Pattersons or the Kings (Brian was somewhat more successful in racing than Alan), they soon became respected pioneers and champions in the then new recognized BMX sub discipline of Dirt Jumping that began as an organized sport in 1989.

BMX racing milestones 

Note: Professional first are on the national level unless otherwise indicated.

*In the NBL "B" Pro/Super Class/"A" Pro/Junior Elite Men depending on the era; in the ABA it is "A" Pro.
**In the NBL it is "AA" Pro/Elite Men; in the ABA it is "AA" Pro.

Career factory and major bike shop sponsors 

Note: This listing only denotes the racer's primary sponsors. At any given time a racer could have numerous ever changing co-sponsors. Primary sponsorships can be verified by BMX press coverage and sponsor's advertisements at the time in question. When possible exact dates are used.

Amateur 
JF&S Plumbing: 1982–1983
Wheel Power Bike Shop: 1983–1989
S&M (Greg Scott & Chris Moeller) Bicycles: 1989
TNT/Goodtimes: March 1990-Mid 1990
Cyclecraft: Mid 1990-December 1992

Professional 
Cyclecraft: 1990 – December 1992
Hyper: January–April 1993
Airwalk: May 1993–1994
Schwinn/Airwalk: 1995–1998
Schwinn: 1998-November 2000
Airwalk/Fit Bike Company: November 2000–2003 Airwalk drops Foster in 2003.
Fit Bikes/Fox Racing/Primo: 2003–present

Career bicycle motocross titles 

Note: Listed are District, State/Provincial/Department, Regional, National, and International titles in italics. "Defunct" refers to the fact of that sanctioning body in question no longer existing at the start of the racer's career or at that stage of his/her career. Depending on point totals of individual racers, winners of Grand Nationals do not necessarily win National titles. Series and one off Championships are also listed in block.

Amateur/Junior Men 
National Bicycle Association (NBA)
None
National Bicycle League (NBL)
1990 18& Over Expert Grandnational Champion
1991 18 & Over Expert NBL National No.1
American Bicycle Association (ABA)
1988 16 Expert Grandnational Champion
Fédération Internationale Amateur de Cyclisme (FIAC)*
1990 17 boys Second Place World Champion
International Bicycle Motocross Federation (IBMXF)*
None
Union Cycliste Internationale (UCI)*
None

*See note in professional section
Championships.

Professional/Elite Men 
National Bicycle Association (NBA)
None (defunct)
National Bicycle League (NBL)
1992 Superclass/"B"-Pro Grandnational Champion
1992 Superclass/"B"-Pro National No.1 (Racing)
1994 Summer Spectacular Series Champion
1995 "AA" Pro National No.3
1996 NBL Dirt Circuit Champion (Dirt Jumping)
American Bicycle Association (ABA)
1994 "AA" Pro US Open East Champion
1995 ABA "Pros in Paradise" Champion. (Racing)
1996, 1997 ABA King of Dirt (KOD) Champion (Dirt Jumping)
United States Bicycle Motocross Association (USBA)
None
International Bicycle Motocross Federation (IBMXF)*
None
Fédération Internationale Amateur de Cyclisme (FIAC)*
None (FIAC did not have a strictly professional division during its existence)
Union Cycliste Internationale (UCI)*
1995 Elite Men Silver Medal World Cup Champion

*Note: Beginning in 1991 the IBMXF and FIAC had been holding joint World Championship events as a transitional phase in merging which began in earnest in 1993. Beginning with the 1996 season the IBMXF and FIAC completed the merger and both ceased to exist as independent entities being integrated into the UCI. Beginning with the 1997 World Championships held in Brighton, England the UCI would officially hold and sanction BMX World Championships and with it inherited all precedents, records, streaks, etc. from both the IBMXF and FIAC.

Pro Series Championships
1998 Summer X Games BMX Dirt Gold Medalist
2001 Summer X Games Downhill BMX Silver Medalist

Notable accolades 
Named one of the ten hottest and fastest rookie pros of 1992 by BMX Plus! magazine.
Voted the "ABA Pro of the Year" in 1995

BMX product lines 
1996 Airwalk Foster Bros. Signature shoes. This product was co-endorsed by his brother Alan.
1997 Schwinn Brian Foster Blue Falcon Frameset
Product Evaluation:
Snap BMX Magazine June 1998, vol. 4, issue 4, no. 23, p. 48.
2000 Schwinn Brian Foster Signature Series complete bicycle.
Product Evaluation:
2001 Schwinn Brian Foster Super Stock Signature Series complete bicycle.
Product Evaluation:
2003 Fit Brian Foster Street Frame
Product Evaluation:
2004 Fit Brian Foster Signature Model Bicycle
Product Evaluation:

Significant injuries 
Broke collarbone in a race in New Jersey when he was thirteen years old in 1985.
Tore anterior cruciate ligament and cartilage in left knee on March 1, 1997, at Sheep Hills. He damaged it after a failed attempt at a mid air "360" and he landed wrong on his left foot. The wind blew him off course during the Schwinn photography session. As a result, he missed both the ABA Winternationals and the Cactus Cup jumping contest. He was laid up for four weeks after surgery.
Broke hand racing at the NBL Christmas Classic in Columbus, Ohio on December 28, 1997 (Day 1). He sat out the next day.
Hurt shoulder in the Pro Open Main in a pile up crash right in front of a jump in the second straight at the NBL Easter Classic National in Sarasota, Florida during the weekend of April 4, 1999.
Broke a bone in his wrist at the CFB Round II freestyle contest in the Summer of 2002. He was out for approximately three weeks
Had his bursa sack removed after pronounced infected swelling on his knee after he struck it against his handle bars in late 2002 before he went with the Fit team to Spain. He was laid up for approximately four weeks.

Racing habits and traits

Miscellaneous 
Foster once held a job painting bicycle frames at one of his past sponsors, Cycle Craft. What makes this unique is that Foster is color blind. He explains how he got the job in an interview in the March/April 1997 issue of Snap BMX Magazine:Snap Magazine: How'd you get a job painting bikes if you're color blind?Brian Foster: (laughter)Side note:   I don't think they knew. I went there just to help out working with bikes and the next ting you know they're like, "Do you know how to paint?" "Yeah, sure." And I started painting. The only time I ran into trouble was late at night when I was by myself and there was no purple paint--I just mixed some blue and some red and see what I came up with (more laughter).Side note:  Cyclecraft knew he was colorblind, and didn't care.  They also miss their friend. -CB-
Brian Foster came very close to becoming ABA National No.1 pro in 1995 Despite a significant gap in points between him and the leaders John Purse and Gary Ellis going into the ABA Grandnationals. He closed that gap greatly at the grandnationals with the great aid of both John Purse and Gary Ellis, defying his reputation of being his best at important races high pressure races. Brian handled the pressure better and was able to past the fourth place racer in his semi final and qualify for the main. He had his fate in his hands enough so that in the "AA" pro main he need only a fifth or sixth-place finish to win the title. The thinking was that there was no way he would finish in the back of the pack. Foster ended up eighth in his first "AA" pro main after crashing into a pile up ahead of him. In the second run of the finals Foster came in last after getting into a wreck in turn three with Jamie Staff as Foster was in second. Meanwhile, Frenchman Christophe Lévêque who was in a distant fourth place in points at the start of the Grandnationals. In the third main Foster ended up in sixth position after the first straight, then managed to move up to second place behind Lévêque with the other contenders for the Grand National win-but not the title-Matt Hadan and Mike King in the rear. Foster only needed to remain in his position and let Lévêque have the Grand National win while Foster took the National #1 title. However, Foster's front wheel slid out and he crashed and the rest of the pack collided into him. After the scramble to pick up their bicycles and head for the finish Foster had come in seventh position. Foster had lost the Number one Plate. In another controversy Gary Ellis was rewarded National #1 instead of Christophe Lévêque due to the rule at the time that no foreigner could win the ABA National Number One Pro title.

Other significant sibling combinations in BMX 
Brent & Brian Patterson
Ronnie & Richie Anderson
Mike & Eddy King
Eric & Robby Rupe
Richard & Gary Houseman

Post BMX career 
Brian Foster is currently a doctor who specializes in physical therapy. He was inducted into the USA BMX Hall Of Fame in 2018 as part of the Racing category.

BMX press magazine interviews and articles 
"Foster Bros.", Go, August 1991, vol. 2, issue 10, p. 52. Two separate interviews of Brian and his brother Alan Foster.
"Young Guns II", BMX Plus!, June 1992, vol. 17, no. 6, p. 27. One of ten rookie pro racers given a short listing profile article.
"The Foster Files", BMX Plus!, March 1993, vol. 16, no. 3, p. 63. Joint interview with his brother Alan Foster.
"face: Brian Foster", Ride BMX Magazine, December 1993, vol. 2, issue 6, no. 8, p. 30.
"Double Interview: Christophe Lévêque & Brian Foster", BMX Plus!, April 1996, vol. 19, no. 4, p. 71. Two separate interviews of the events of the controversial 1995 ABA Grandnational, including Foster's losing his bid for National No.1.
"Brian Foster Interview", Snap BMX Magazine, March/April 1997, vol. 4, issue 2, no. 15, p. 62.
"tabletop how-to's:", Snap BMX Magazine, September/October 1997, vol. 4, issue 5, no. 18, p. 43. Foster gives a brief description on how to properly execute a "tabletop" maneuver.
"Q&A: Have you ever cheated racing?", Snap BMX Magazine, May 1999, vol. 6, issue 3, no. 31, p. 24. One of 10 separate interviews of different racers including Matt Hadan and Dale Holmes asking if they ever cheated during a race.
"Brian Foster", Snap BMX Magazine, May 1999, vol. 6, issue 5, no. 31, poster back.
"Brian Foster", Snap BMX Magazine, May 2000, vol. 7, issue 5, no. 43, poster back. Interview conducted by his brother Alan Foster.
"Double Down", Snap BMX Magazine, August 2000, vol. 7, issue 8, no. 46, p. 80. Brian discusses his double knee operation in April 2000.
"Wasted Land", BMX Plus!, October 2000, vol. 23, no. 10, p. 78. Foster's editorial article about the paradoxical effects of shrinking areas to dirt jump or to street/freestyle and the increasing popularity of the sport.
"Ask Brian", Transworld BMX, October November 2002, vol. 9, issue 11, no. 73, p. 40. Foster answers submitted questions by the readers of Transworld BMX.
"Four Pros & 3 wishes", Transworld BMX, July 2004, vol. 11, issue 7, no. 93, p. 20. He is one of four whimsical interviews with dirt jumping pros asked what are the three things they would have either inside or outside the BMX world. Brian Castillo, Adam Banton and Todd Walkowiak are the other subjects.
"Brian Foster and the TWBMX Ten", Transworld BMX, November 2004, vol. 11, issue 11, no. 97, p. 98.

BMX magazine covers 

Note: Only magazines that were in publication at the time of the racer's career(s) are listed unless specifically noted.

Minicycle/BMX Action & Super BMX:
None
Bicycle Motocross Action & Go:
None
BMX Plus!:
March 1991, vol. 14, no. 3, in virtual tie in between Dave Cullinan (4) in foreground outside and Christophe Lévêque in background inside.
March 1993, vol. 16, no. 3, (6) with brother Alan Foster (4) In bottom insert Mike King.
August 1993, vol. 16, no. 8, (1) on the left hand side slightly behind Eric Carter (25). In insert Freestyler Matt Hoffman.
May 1994, vol. 17, no. 5, in second behind Gary Ellis (1) in the lead and ahead of brother Alan Foster (4) in third.
July 1994 Vol.17 No.7. In insert four girls modeling T-shirts
July 1995 Vol.18 No.7. In top insert three girls modeling T-shirts; in middle left insert a full suspension Mongoose BMX bicycle.
August 1996, vol. 19, no. 8, In right insert. In main insert Andy Contes (1) along with two unidentifieds (3) & (14).
February 1997, vol. 20, no. 2, (3) in middle insert in second; Randy Stumpfhauser (200) leading; Charles Townsend (10) in fourth; unidentified (16) in third. In top right insert dirt jumper Matt Beringer. In bottom right insert Kiyomi Waller (403). In bottom left insert various helmets.
Total BMX:
None
Bicycles and Dirt:
None
Ride BMX Magazine: UK & US versions
Ride US: February/March 1996 issue 20
Ride US: May 2004
Ride UK: March 2008 issue 113
Snap BMX Magazine & Transworld BMX:
May 1998, vol. 5, issue 3, no. 22, (Snap)
May 2000, vol. 7, issue 5, no. 43, In top insert. In main image Danny Nelson (1) slightly behind Matt Pohlkamp (7) and Eric Abbadessa (9).
August 2002, vol. 9, issue 8, no. 70, (TWBMX)
BMX Freedom:
October 2002
BMX Rider UK:
November 2003 No.16
Moto Mag:
None
BMX World:

NBA World: & NBmX World (The official NBA/NBmxA membership publication):
None
Bicycles Today & BMX Today (The official NBL membership publication under two names):

ABA Action, American BMXer, BMXer (The official ABA membership publication under three names):

USBA Racer (The official USBA membership publication):
None

References

External links 
 The American Bicycle Association (ABA) Website.
 The National Bicycle League (NBL) Website.
 American Bicycle.
 Electric bikes.

1972 births
Living people
American male cyclists
BMX riders
Sportspeople from Wilmington, Delaware
People from Joppatowne, Maryland